Sorina Grigore (born 5 December 1973) is a Romanian luger. She competed in the women's singles event at the 1994 Winter Olympics.

References

1973 births
Living people
Romanian female lugers
Olympic lugers of Romania
Lugers at the 1994 Winter Olympics
Sportspeople from Bucharest